Maduve Madu Thamashe Nodu is a 1984 Indian Kannada-language film, directed by Sathya and produced by Dwarakish. The film stars Vishnuvardhan, Aarathi, Dwarkish, Mahalakshmi and Jai Jagadish. The film has a musical score by Vijayanand. The movie is a remake of the 1983 Tamil movie, Dowry Kalyanam.

Plot

The movie revolves around the herculian effort of a middle-class family man and his wife in arranging marriage of his sister and getting job for his younger brother. Vishnuvardhan plays the main lead of ganesha, Aarthi plays his wife character Uma, Mahalakshmi plays the role of the sister Gowri and Dwarkish plays role of the groom to whom Gowri is engaged. It also deals with exploitation of the parents of the groom in the name of dowry.

Cast

Vishnuvardhan as Ganesha
Aarathi as Uma 
Dwarkish as Mohan
Jai Jagadish as Raja
Mahalakshmi as Gowri
Srinivasa Murthy as DIG Kuchela (Special Appearance)
C. R. Simha as Kuchela (Special Appearance)
Vajramuni as Rahim (Special Appearance)
Sundar Raj in Special Appearance as thief
Balakrishna as Neelakanta Shastry
Lokanath as Jalendar Subbu
Shivaram as Gundu Rao
Leelavathi
Uma Shivakumar as Rushyendramani

Soundtrack
The music was composed by Vijay Anand.

References

External links
 
 

1986 films
1980s Kannada-language films
Kannada remakes of Tamil films
Films scored by Vijayanand